The Unity Centre of Communist Revolutionaries of India (Marxist–Leninist) (Ajmer group) was a communist organisation in India, which emerged from a split in the Unity Centre of Communist Revolutionaries of India (Marxist-Leninist) (Harbhajan Sohi) in 1982.

References

Political parties established in 1982
1982 establishments in India
Defunct communist parties in India
Political parties with year of disestablishment missing